The Hawker Hoopoe was a British prototype naval fighter aircraft designed and built in 1927 by Hawker Aircraft.

Service trials found the aircraft to be unsatisfactory, and it was superseded by the same company's Nimrod design.

Design and development
Named after the bird of the same name, the Hoopoe was a private venture design proposal to meet Specification N.21/26 although the aircraft did not follow the specification closely. The Hoopoe was a single-seater biplane with an open cockpit and fixed undercarriage. Floats were also later tested.

Redesign of the wings changed the layout from a two-bay biplane to a single-bay configuration. Three engine types were fitted during the short trial period, two variants of the Bristol Mercury were later replaced by an Armstrong Siddeley Jaguar and Panther with an increase in performance.

Trials at Felixstowe in 1929 with floats fitted showed that the aircraft was severely underpowered with the Mercury powerplant, requiring the change to the Jaguar engine. Service interest in the type had waned by autumn 1930 although the single prototype continued in development flying with Armstrong Siddeley and the Royal Aircraft Establishment until 1932 when the Hoopoe was scrapped.

Specifications (Hoopoe - Single bay wings, Panther III)

See also

References

Notes

Bibliography

 Mason, Francis K. Hawker Aircraft since 1920. London: Putnam, 1991.

External links

Flightglobal archive - Hawker Hoopoe, 1931

1920s British fighter aircraft
Hoopoe
Carrier-based aircraft
Aircraft first flown in 1928
Biplanes